The St. Paul African Methodist Episcopal Church is a historic African Methodist Episcopal (AME) church at 103 Mispillion Street in Harrington, Kent County, Delaware.  It is a single-story wood-frame structure with vernacular Gothic Revival features.  It has a steeply-pitched gable roof, and narrow pointed-arch stained-glass windows with scissor-like muntins and mullions.  It was built about 1895 for a predominantly African-American congregation founded in 1830.

The church was listed on the National Register of Historic Places in 2016.

See also
National Register of Historic Places listings in Kent County, Delaware

References

African Methodist Episcopal churches in Delaware
Churches on the National Register of Historic Places in Delaware
Gothic Revival architecture in Delaware
Churches completed in 1895
19th-century Methodist church buildings in the United States
Churches in Kent County, Delaware